Ulotrichopus recchiai is a moth of the  family Erebidae. It is found in Ethiopia and Kenya.

References

Moths described in 1978
Ulotrichopus
Moths of Africa